The 2017–18 season was Derby County's tenth consecutive season in the Championship in their 134th year in existence. Along with competing in the Championship, the club also participated in the FA Cup and EFL Cup.

The season covered the period from 1 July 2017 to 30 June 2018.

Players

Current squad

Out on loan

Pre-season

Friendlies
On 9 May 2017, Derby County announced they will face two German sides as part of their pre-season preparations. Three days later The Rams confirmed their pre-season schedule ahead of the new campaign.

Competitions

Championship

Derby County became the first team to score a goal in the Championship 2017–18 season when Bradley Johnson netted after 11 minutes of their opening match against Sunderland.

League table

Result summary

Results by matchday

Matches
On 21 June 2017, the league fixtures were announced.

Football League play-offs

FA Cup

In the FA Cup, Derby County entered the competition in the third round and were drawn away to Manchester United.

EFL Cup
On 16 June 2017, the first round draw took place with a trip to Grimsby Town announced. Following the abandonment off the first round tie, the fixture was rescheduled for 22 August 2017. Victory against Grimsby Town in the rescheduled match set up a second round tie against Barnsley.

Statistics

Appearances and goals

|-
! colspan=14 style=background:#dcdcdc; text-align:center| Goalkeepers

|-
! colspan=14 style=background:#dcdcdc; text-align:center| Defenders

|-
! colspan=14 style=background:#dcdcdc; text-align:center| Midfielders

|-
! colspan=14 style=background:#dcdcdc; text-align:center| Forwards

|-
! colspan=14 style=background:#dcdcdc; text-align:center| Players transferred or loaned out during the season

References

Notes

Derby County
Derby County F.C. seasons